William Addison may refer to:

 William Addison (physician) (1803–1881), British physician
 William Addison (VC) (1883–1962), holder of the Victoria Cross
 William Addison, 4th Viscount Addison (born 1945), British Conservative peer
 William Addison (chess player) (1933–2008), American chess master
 William Wilkinson Addison (1905–1992), English historian and jurist